Villiyanur Matha is a 1983 Indian Tamil-language film, directed by K. Thankappan. The movie was dubbed into Malayalam language as Lourde Mathavu.

Cast
Baby Anju 
Rajkumar Sethupathy 
Vincent as Father
Prameela 
Ranipadmini
Sangeeta
Y. G. Mahendra 
Sarath Babu 
Vijayashanti
Manorama

Soundtrack: Tamil version
The music was composed by G. Devarajan.

Soundtrack: Malayalam version
The music was composed by G. Devarajan and lyrics were written by Mankombu Gopalakrishnan.

References

External links
 

1983 films
1980s Tamil-language films
Films scored by G. Devarajan